James Ferentz (born June 5, 1989) is an American football center for the New England Patriots of the National Football League (NFL). He was signed by the Houston Texans as an undrafted free agent in 2014. He played college football at Iowa. He has also played for the Denver Broncos.

High school career
Ferentz played football at Iowa City High School in Iowa City, Iowa. He also wrestled earning second place at the Iowa high school wrestling tournament his senior year.

College career
Ferentz attended and played college football at Iowa from 2008–2012. He was named second-team All-Big Ten while at the University of Iowa.

Professional career

Houston Texans
Ferentz was signed by the Houston Texans on May 16, 2014. He was waived by the Texans on August 30, 2014 and was signed to the practice squad the next day. He signed a reserve/futures contract with the Texans on December 30, 2014.

On September 5, 2015, Ferentz was waived by the Texans.

Denver Broncos
On September 6, 2015, the Denver Broncos claimed Ferentz off waivers. In the 2015 regular season, he played in 13 games. On February 7, 2016, Ferentz was part of the Broncos team that won Super Bowl 50. In the game, the Broncos defeated the Carolina Panthers by a score of 24–10. In the 2016 season, he appeared in six games for the Broncos.

On May 10, 2017, Ferentz was released by the Broncos.

New England Patriots
On May 18, 2017, Ferentz signed with the New England Patriots. He was waived on September 2, 2017 and signed to the practice squad the next day. He signed a reserve/future contract with the Patriots on February 6, 2018.

On September 1, 2018, Ferentz was waived by the Patriots and was signed to the practice squad the next day. Ferentz was promoted to the Patriots' active roster on November 3, 2018. Ferentz won his second Super Bowl when the Patriots defeated the Los Angeles Rams 13-3 in Super Bowl LIII.

On August 31, 2019, Ferentz was released during final roster cuts. He was re-signed on September 6, 2019 with the release of Russell Bodine.

On September 16, 2020, Ferentz was signed to the Patriots practice squad. He was promoted to the active roster on September 26, 2020. He was placed on the reserve/COVID-19 list by the team on October 16 and activated on October 28.

On May 17, 2021, Ferentz re-signed with the Patriots. On August 31, Ferentz was waived and signed to the practice squad the following day. He was signed to the active roster on October 27. He was released on November 8, 2021 and re-signed to the practice squad.

On March 14, 2022, Ferentz re-signed with the Patriots. He was released on August 30, 2022 and signed to the practice squad the next day. He was promoted to the active roster on September 6.

On March 9, 2023, Ferentz re-signed with the Patriots.

Personal life
James Ferentz is the son of Mary and Kirk Ferentz, the Iowa Hawkeyes head coach.  He is brother to noted football player, Brian Ferentz.

References

External links
 Patriots bio
 

1989 births
Living people
American football centers
American people of Hungarian descent
Denver Broncos players
Houston Texans players
Iowa City High School alumni
Iowa Hawkeyes football players
New England Patriots players
Players of American football from Iowa
Sportspeople from Iowa City, Iowa